Glinos may refer to:
 7124 Glinos, a main-belt asteroid named after Tom Glinos
 Dimitris Glinos (1882–1943), a Greek philosopher, educator and politician
 Tom Glinos (born 1960) Canadian amateur astronomer